Khor Kalmat is a lagoon located along the Makran coast of Balochistan, Pakistan. The Basol River drains into the Khor Kalmat lagoon. In recent times, it has gained attention for being the locality where the Pakistan Navy plans to build a base, known as the Kalmat Naval Base.

Kalmat lies about 350 km west of Karachi; the area is located at a distance of about 20 km from the Makran Coastal Highway. There are four main settlements in the area viz. Kalmat, Chundi, Gursant and Makola. People are living below the poverty line and thus dependence on natural resources mainly fishery has increased. Now there is uncertainty in returns expected from fishing.

The population of Kalmat area is about 2,000. Majority of them are fishermen and belong to the Kalmati and Sanghur Baloch tribes. About 95% of the population is engaged in fishing activities.

Kalmat naval base
The Pakistan Navy is planning to construct the Kalmat Naval Base at Khor Kalmat.

Buzi Makola Wildlife Sanctuary
The Buzi Makola Wildlife Sanctuary is located at the Khor Kalmat.

Fishery
Fishery is the main source of economic sustainance and revenue in the region; the water surrounding Khor Kalmat provide high quality prawns and other different types of fish. Annually, millions of rupees worth of prawns and fish are exported from Kalmat to Karachi and the international market. Sources say that if the government of Pakistan decides to go ahead with their plan to build the naval base, it will cost thousands of fishermen their jobs.  It is also feared that thousands of fishermen will lose their jobs, as the Pakistan Navy will take over the area.

References

External links
 World Wide Fund for Nature's development at Khor Kalmat

Lagoons of Pakistan
Landforms of Balochistan (Pakistan)